Keavy Eunice Vicente is a Filipino screenwriter. She is most famous for writing Pearl Next Door, a girls love spin off of the Filipino boys love web series Gameboys.

Education and personal life
Vicente attended and finished high school at Miriam College in 2007. She finished her journalism degree at the University of Santo Tomas, Manila in 2011. She was Artistic Director of the 30th season of the Artistang Artlets at the University of Santo Tomas Faculty of Arts and Letters.

Select work

References

Living people
Filipino writers
Tagalog-language writers
University of Santo Tomas alumni
Year of birth missing (living people)